Amabilis of Riom (or Amabilis of Auvergne) was a French saint.  Sidonius Apollinaris brought Amabilis to serve at Clermont.

He served as a cantor in the church of Saint Mary at Clermont and as a precentor at the cathedral of Clermont and then as a parish priest in Riom.  He acquired a reputation for holiness in his lifetime.

Amabilis is not to be confused with a female saint (also known as Saint Mable) with this name who died in 634 AD; she was the daughter of an Anglo-Saxon king and became a nun at Saint-Amand monastery, Rouen.  Her feast day is 11 July.

Veneration

Riom grew up around the collegiate church of Saint Amable, which was the object of pilgrimages.

References

475 deaths
5th-century Christian saints
5th-century Christian clergy
Gallo-Roman saints
Year of birth unknown